Gabriel Clarke is a British TV journalist and documentary filmmaker.
 
Clarke earned an English Literature degree from the University of London and began his journalistic career with local newspapers in Somerset and Bristol. He started his sports broadcasting career with Radio Trent in the East Midlands before moving into TV.

Clarke joined ITV Sport in 1991, as a reporter for the Saint and Greavsie television programme.

He has worked across ITV Sport's output covering European Championships, World Cups, Rugby World Cups, the Boat Race and World Championship boxing, and also presenting ITV's Football League highlights show Football League Extra.

He was a roving reporter with the England national football team at the 2006 and 2010 FIFA World Cup, and UEFA Euro 2012.

Clarke has been named the Royal Television Society Sports News Reporter of the Year three times: 2001, 2002 and 2005.
He is also the winner of the Royal Television Society awards for Sports Feature (2002, 2005) and Sports Creative Sequence (2002).

Documentaries

Personal life
He is the son of Jane Harris and film director Alan Clarke (1935–90), whose work includes Scum, Made in Britain and The Firm. Clarke Snr., an Everton F.C. supporter named his son after Scotland and Everton forward Jimmy Gabriel.

References

External links

1963 births
Living people
British sports journalists
Alumni of the University of London
English association football commentators